Kenneth I. Wolpin is an American economist, currently the Distinguished Research Professor and Lay Family Professor of Economics at Rice University. At University of Pennsylvania, he was previously the Walter H. and Leonore Annenberg Professor of Social Sciences and Lawrence R. Klein Professor of Economics. From 2008 to 2011, he was also Editor of Wiley journal International Economic Review and also, from 1987 to 1997, co-editor of University of Wisconsin journal Journal of Human Resources.

References

Year of birth missing (living people)
Living people
Rice University faculty
American economists
University of Pennsylvania faculty
City University of New York alumni
City College of New York alumni
Fellows of the Econometric Society